Amélie Perrin (born 30 March 1980 in Dreux, Eure-et-Loir) is a female hammer thrower from France. Her personal best throw is 71.38 metres, achieved in July 2006 in Sotteville-lès-Rouen.

Personal bests
Discus throw: 56.05 m –  Salon-de-Provence, 26 May 2002
Hammer throw: 71.38 m –  Sotteville-lès-Rouen, 2 July 2006

Achievements

References

External links
 
 
 
 Tilastopaja biography

1980 births
Living people
Sportspeople from Dreux
French female hammer throwers
Athletes (track and field) at the 2008 Summer Olympics
Olympic athletes of France
World Athletics Championships athletes for France
Athletes (track and field) at the 2005 Mediterranean Games
Athletes (track and field) at the 2009 Mediterranean Games
Mediterranean Games competitors for France